Jakov-Anton Vasilj (born 2 June 2002) is a Croatian professional footballer currently playing as a midfielder for Prva HNL club Lokomotiva on loan from Dinamo Zagreb.

Personal life
Vasilj is the brother of fellow professional footballer Ivan-Anton Vasilj.

Career statistics

Club

Notes

References

External links
 

2002 births
Living people
Sportspeople from Zadar
Association football midfielders
Croatian footballers
Croatia youth international footballers
NK Zadar players
HNK Hajduk Split players
GNK Dinamo Zagreb II players
GNK Dinamo Zagreb players
NK Lokomotiva Zagreb players
First Football League (Croatia) players
Croatian Football League players